Portlethen railway station serves the town of Portlethen in Aberdeenshire, Scotland. It is sited  from Carlisle via Perth, and is between Stonehaven and Aberdeen, on the Dundee to Aberdeen line.

History 
The station was opened on 1 April 1850. After closure in 1956, the station was reopened nearly 30 years later on 17 May 1985.

In 2021, an investigation was started after trains went through an emergency speed restriction near the station close to line speed.

Facilities 
Unstaffed, the facilities at the station are minimal, consisting of two car parks (and sets of bike racks), and shelters and benches on each platform. There is, however, step-free access to and between the platforms (the latter via Cookston Road). There is a ticket machine in shelter on platform 2.

Passenger volume
In the year 2004–2005, Portlethen station attracted just under 11,000 (combined entry/exit) passengers. By 2006–07, the annual number of passengers had increased to over 21,000 and by 2012-13 carried around 28,000 passengers per year.  In 2014/15 that had increased to 57,152.

The statistics cover twelve month periods that start in April.

Services
Portlethen previously had a somewhat limited service, with trains only calling early in the morning and evening peaks and at night times with large gaps at certain times during the day, but an improved timetable has accounted for much of the growth in recent years. As of May 2022, there is one train per hour in each direction between Montrose and Inverurie.

References

External Links 

 Video footage of the station on YouTube

Railway stations in Aberdeenshire
Former Caledonian Railway stations
Railway stations in Great Britain opened in 1850
Railway stations in Great Britain closed in 1956
Reopened railway stations in Great Britain
Railway stations in Great Britain opened in 1985
Railway stations served by ScotRail
1850 establishments in Scotland
Portlethen